Skočice is a municipality and village in Strakonice District in the South Bohemian Region of the Czech Republic. It has about 200 inhabitants.

Administrative parts
The village of Lidmovice is an administrative part of Skočice.

Geography
The western part of the municipality with the Skočice village lies in the Bohemian Forest Foothills, the eastern part with Lidmovice lies in the České Budějovice Basin. The slopes of the hill are protected as the Skočický Hrad Nature Reserve.

The Lidmovický Brook springs here and flows across the territory. There are several ponds in the municipality, the largest are Jordán and Louženský.

History
The first written mention of Skočice is from 1399.

Sights

The main landmark of Skočice is the atypical octagonal Church of the Visitation of Our Lady. It was built is the early Baroque style in 1677–1678. The church, originally as a chapel, was built for Polyxena Ludmila of Sternberg for its alleged miraculous image of Our Lady of Help (a copy of Cranach's Icon of Maria Hilf in Passau), and subsequently became a pilgrimage site. The area includes the cemetery and the Chapel of Saint John of Nepomuk from the mid-18th century.

References

External links

Villages in Strakonice District